William Milroy may refer to:
 William Milroy (badminton), Canadian badminton player
 William A. Milroy, Canadian general
 Bill Milroy, Australian rules footballer